Abel Thermeus (born 19 January 1983) is a Haitian football player, who is a striker. He played for Atromitos Yeroskipou.

France-born Thermeus spent a couple of unsuccessful years at Monaco before moving to lower league side Créteil. In January 2006, he move to Scottish Premier League side Motherwell, where he quickly gained the nickname "The Flask". He is strong with a good touch and an eye for goal which will give us something extra," manager Terry Butcher told the club website.Thermeus played two league games for Motherwell as a substitute, the second of which, against Kilmarnock, he was sent-off for a headbutt. In summer 2006, he signed for Levante UD. In July 2008, he played a trial game with English League Two side Bradford City against Guiseley, which Bradford lost 2–1.

International career
"The fox" made his debut for Haiti in an October 2007 friendly match against Costa Rica and played in the February 2008 friendly series against Venezuela, which served as a warm-up for the 2010 FIFA World Cup qualification match against Nicaragua or the Netherlands Antilles.

References

External links
 

1983 births
Living people
Association football forwards
Haitian footballers
Haiti international footballers
2009 CONCACAF Gold Cup players
AS Monaco FC players
Ligue 2 players
US Créteil-Lusitanos players
Scottish Premier League players
Motherwell F.C. players
Segunda División B players
Atlético Levante UD players
Atromitos Yeroskipou players
Haitian expatriate footballers
Haitian expatriate sportspeople in Scotland
Expatriate footballers in Scotland
Haitian expatriate sportspeople in Spain
Expatriate footballers in Spain
Haitian expatriate sportspeople in Hungary
Expatriate footballers in Hungary
Haitian expatriate sportspeople in Cyprus
Expatriate footballers in Cyprus
French footballers
French sportspeople of Haitian descent
French expatriate footballers
French expatriate sportspeople in Scotland
French expatriate sportspeople in Spain
French expatriate sportspeople in Hungary
French expatriate sportspeople in Cyprus